Presles is the name or part of the name of several places:

In France

 Presles, Calvados, in the Calvados département 
 Presles, Isère, in the Isère département 
 Presles, Val-d'Oise, in the Val-d'Oise département
 Presles-en-Brie, in the Seine-et-Marne département 
 Presles-et-Boves, in the Aisne département 
 Presles-et-Thierny, in the Aisne département

In Belgium

 Presles, Belgium, a village in the municipality of Aiseau-Presles, Hainaut